Hungary competed at the 1900 Summer Olympics in Paris, France.
Austrian and Hungarian results at early Olympic Games are generally kept separate despite the union of the two nations as Austria-Hungary at the time.


Medalists

The following Hungarian competitors won medals at the games. In the discipline sections below, the medalists' names are bolded.

|  style="text-align:left; width:78%; vertical-align:top;"|

|  style="text-align:left; width:22%; vertical-align:top;"|

Multiple medalists
The following competitors won multiple medals at the 1900 Olympic Games.

Competitors

| width=78% style="text-align:left; vertical-align:top" |

The following is the list of number of competitors participating in the Games:

| width="22%" style="text-align:left; vertical-align:top" |

The following is the list of dates, when Hungary won medals:

Results by event

Aquatics

Swimming

Hungary continued to win a medal with each entry in a swimming event, taking three medals in 1900 to add to the two won in 1896.  Halmay's medals were silver and bronze, however, whereas Hajós had taken a pair of gold medals four year earlier.

Men

Athletics

Hungary won a gold and a bronze medal in athletics, tying Canada for 4th place in the sport's medal leaderboard. 9 athletes competed in 13 events.

Men

Track & road events

Field events

Fencing

Hungary first competed in fencing at the Olympics in the sport's second appearance.  The nation sent seven fencers.

Men

According to Herman De Wael there were two other Hungarian fencers in the masters épée competition, but they did not advance from round 1. Their names are not known.

Gymnastics

Artistic
Hungary's second gymnastics appearance included a second appearance by Gyula Kakas. The nation's two gymnasts won no medals in a heavily France-dominated single event.

Men

Notes

Nations at the 1900 Summer Olympics
1900
Olympics